¡Qué Chulada! is a studio album by Tierra Caliente group, La Dinastía de Tuzantla, released on December 4, 2007. The album spent four weeks on the Top Latin Albums in early 2008 and sold 21,000 copies in the U.S.

The album includes the single "Maldito Texto" which was an award-winning song at the 2009 BMI Latin Awards.

Track listing 
The information from AllMusic.

References

2007 albums
Tierra Caliente albums